Alster (A 50) is an intelligence ship of the German Navy. She is the lead ship of the German Navy's Type 423. The vessel is named for the river Alster located in Hamburg and Schleswig-Holstein.

Design
Alster is a reconnaissance ship, which was originally intended to gather data on Soviet ships. She has a wide array of modern electromagnetic, hydroacoustic, and electro-optic sensors for strategic intelligence gathering. Her sensitive antennas can identify radar locations, monitor flights, and can also listen in on radio and phone conversations. She can be used as an advance warning unit. Her crew is a mixture of German Navy sailors and German Bundesnachrichtendienst (Federal Intelligence Agency) officers.

Service history
On 26 October 2006, Israeli planes flew over Alster while she was serving with the UNIFIL peacekeeping forces off the coast of Lebanon, stirring an international incident. German authorities declared that the planes had fired shots at the ship and evaded from the scene launching flares. The Israeli side, though denying that firing had occurred, acknowledged the incident and declared that no aggression was meant. Diplomatic activity resulted in a settlement, though none of the parties backed from its position.

References

Auxiliary ships of the German Navy
1988 ships
Ships built in Flensburg
Oste-class fleet service ships